Rogério Miranda Silva or simply Rogerinho (born December 24, 1984 in Paragominas-PA), is a Brazilian attacking midfielder. who currently plays for São Francisco PA.

Career
Since his move to the Emirates club Al Wasl, Rogério failed to secure a position in the first team squad despite his great shooting abilities, this led to him being loaned out to Ponte Preta in the 2008-2009 season, then to Fortaleza in the 2009-2010 season.

Standing for nine months and no club in 2018, Rogerinho earned a new chance in football after injury and surgery on his right knee, when he joined Uberlândia in 2019. In February 2019, he then joined São Francisco PA.

Honours
Pará State League: 2004, 2006
Ceará State League: 2007

Contract
Fortaleza (Loan) 26 March 2007 to 31 December 2007
Figueirense 27 April 2005 to 25 April 2010
Vissel Kobe 1 February 2011 to 1 January 2012

External links

 sambafoot
 CBF
 zerozero.pt
 fortalezaec.net

References

1984 births
Living people
Brazilian footballers
Brazilian expatriate footballers
Figueirense FC players
Paysandu Sport Club players
Fortaleza Esporte Clube players
Esporte Clube Bahia players
Associação Atlética Ponte Preta players
Al-Wasl F.C. players
Expatriate footballers in the United Arab Emirates
Vissel Kobe players
Campeonato Brasileiro Série A players
J1 League players
Expatriate footballers in Japan
Ceará Sporting Club players
Clube Náutico Capibaribe players
UAE Pro League players
Brazilian expatriate sportspeople in China
Expatriate footballers in China
Qingdao Hainiu F.C. (1990) players
China League One players
Association football midfielders
Sportspeople from Pará